Saint-Rambert-d'Albon (literally Saint-Rambert of Albon) is a commune in the Drôme department in southeastern France.

Population

Notable residents
 Wilfride Piollet, ballerina

International relations
Saint-Rambert-d'Albon is twinned with:
 Kernen im Remstal, Germany
 Mango, Italy

See also 
Communes of the Drôme department

References

External links

Official site

Communes of Drôme